Andrei Girotto (born 17 February 1992) is a Brazilian professional footballer who plays as a defensive midfielder for FC Nantes.

Club career
Girotto was born in Bento Gonçalves, Rio Grande do Sul, he made his senior debut with Metropolitano in 2010. After a short loan stint at Hercílio Luz in 2011, he established himself as a starter and played key role during the 2013 Campeonato Catarinense, helping his side to qualify for the Série D.

On 26 April 2013, Girotto moved to América Mineiro, signing a contract until December 2014. He made his debut for the club on 1 June by starting in a 1–0 Série B away win against Palmeiras, and scored his first goals on 5 July after netting his team's all goals in a 2–2 home draw against Paraná.

On 20 December 2014, Girotto signed a one-year contract with Série A club Palmeiras. He made his debut in the category on 1 July, coming on as a late substitute for Arouca in a 2–0 home win against Chapecoense; his first goal in the category came on 23 August, but in a 2–1 away loss against Atlético Mineiro.

On 18 December 2015, Girotto was released by Palmeiras, and moved abroad for the first time in his career after joining Kyoto Sanga. On 4 January 2017, he signed with Chapecoense for one season.

On 12 August 2017, Ligue 1 club FC Nantes announced the signing of Girotto on a four-year deal. On 16 September 2017, he scored his first competitive goal for Nantes with a low shot 30 yards from goal that bent its way into the net off the right-hand post in a Ligue 1 1–0 home win over Caen.

Career statistics

Honours
Palmeiras
Copa do Brasil: 2015

Chapecoense
Campeonato Catarinense: 2017

Nantes
Coupe de France: 2021–22

References

External links

1992 births
Living people
Sportspeople from Rio Grande do Sul
Brazilian footballers
Association football midfielders
Campeonato Brasileiro Série A players
Campeonato Brasileiro Série B players
Campeonato Brasileiro Série D players
Clube Atlético Metropolitano players
América Futebol Clube (MG) players
Sociedade Esportiva Palmeiras players
Associação Chapecoense de Futebol players
Ligue 1 players
FC Nantes players
J2 League players
Kyoto Sanga FC players
Brazilian expatriate footballers
Brazilian expatriate sportspeople in Japan
Brazilian expatriate sportspeople in France
Expatriate footballers in Japan
Expatriate footballers in France
Brazilian people of Italian descent